The ANF Les Mureaux 180 was a prototype French fighter aircraft of the 1930s. designed and built by Les Ateliers de Construction du Nord de la France et des Mureaux. It was a single-engined, two-seat, gull wing monoplane, only one was built and the programme was abandoned as obsolete.

Design and development
The ANF Les Mureaux 180C.2 first flew on 10 February 1935 with a  Hispano-Suiza 12Xbrs engine and a single fin and rudder. In April 1935 the 180 was modified with a Hispano-Suiza 12Xcrs motor-canon engine, it had 20mm cannon that fired through the propeller hub. The aircraft was also fitted with two wing-mounted 7.5mm machine guns. The observer also had a machine gun mounted on a flexible mount and the tail unit was changed to two vertical surfaces. It continued to be tested until April 1936 but the project was abandoned when the design was considered to be obsolete.

Specifications

See also

Notes

References

180
1930s French fighter aircraft
Single-engined tractor aircraft
Cancelled military aircraft projects of France